Gungor is a musical collective formed by husband and wife duo Michael Gungor and Lisa Gungor. The group's music has been compared to the music of Sufjan Stevens, Bon Iver and Arcade Fire.

The band has released seven studio albums, the last one appearing in March 2019. These albums explored a broad musical soundscape and charted the couple's changing beliefs from traditional Christianity through a more panentheistic worldview, other religions, and apophatic theology. In early 2018, they announced a shift in direction that would see Gungor return to the progressive spiritual space, while the less mainstream material will move to "other projects" including Michael and Lisa’s solo projects.

History 

Michael Gungor grew up in Marshfield, Wisconsin. He is the son of pastor and author Ed Gungor. He began writing and playing music at a young age and went on to study jazz guitar at both Western Michigan University and the University of North Texas while also touring and working as a multi-instrumentalist musician.

Lisa Gungor grew up in Deming, New Mexico. She came from a "sports-crazed" family and didn't fully commit to her musical abilities until her senior year in high school.

Michael and Lisa met at Oral Roberts University during their first year.

Michael renamed the group from The Michael Gungor Band to simply Gungor in 2010. The first album release under the new name was Beautiful Things in 2010 that features a short gospel-blues jam featuring Israel Houghton titled "Heaven". In 2011, the album and its title track, "Beautiful Things", were nominated for the Grammy categories Best Rock or Rap Gospel Album and Best Gospel Song, respectively.

In 2011, Gungor released Ghosts Upon the Earth. Gungor followed up with a live album, A Creation Liturgy in 2012. The band's third studio album, I Am Mountain, was released on September 24, 2013. On October 24, 2013, the band began its 60-city headline tour across the U.S., Canada, Australia, New Zealand, and Europe.

Though Gungor's music is filled with Christian themes, the collective has attempted to distance itself from being labeled simply a "Christian" band due to the problematic way the term is often used. Michael refers to Gungor as a collective because at any given time the group is composed of 3-10 members. He and his wife believe that their music transcends one genre. Gungor write songs that are a mix of indie rock, post rock, progressive rock, soft rock and more. If asked, Michael describes his song style as "alternative, folk, textured and experimental." They performed at SXSW 2014.

In 2015, Gungor embarked on their most ambitious creative project thus far: One Wild Life. The band released three full-length albums—Soul, Spirit and Body—in a span of 12 months. One Wild Life: Soul kicked off the trilogy on August 7, 2015. While each record carries a distinct vibe, the album series presents a body of work that celebrates the adventure and challenges faced by Michael and Lisa Gungor since the release of their previous album "I Am Mountain". One Wild Life: Soul charted on multiple Billboard charts the first week of release, including Billboard 200. On One Wild Life: Soul, Michael and Lisa wrote a song dedicated to Lucie, their second daughter, who was diagnosed with Down Syndrome.

On April 26, 2018, Gungor announced on the band's official Facebook page that they were going to address the "multiple personality thing going on within its musical stylings" by bringing Gungor back to its roots in "the progressive spiritual space, and finding different homes for some of the other music that we’ve tried unsuccessfully to fundamentally change the Gungor brand with". This was accompanied by the removal of I Am Mountain and One Wild Life series from online stores and streaming services, the latter being replaced by a 90-minute "director's cut" of the three albums. Michael and Lisa also announced an upcoming solo album each in the post.

On February 1, 2019, the band announced that their upcoming "End of the World" Tour would be "Gungor's farewell tour". While Michael and Lisa would continue to make music, future projects would no longer be recorded under the Gungor band name.

On March 1, 2019, the band released Archives, an album intended to wind down the project. Archives is composed of previously unreleased material as well as re-released material.

However, starting in 2021, the group began releasing singles, including collaborations and original songs.

Discography

Awards 
 Independent Music Awards 2013: A Creation Liturgy (Live) - Best Live Performance Album

See also  
 Kevin Olusola who performed on several tours with the band

References

External links 
 
 Gungor at AllMusic
 The Michael Gungor Band at AllMusic

American musical duos
Musical groups established in 2006